Sundhagen is a municipality in Mecklenburg-Vorpommern, Germany, located in Amt Miltzow in the district of Vorpommern-Rügen. Sundhagen was constituted on 7 June 2009 by fusion of the following municipalities:
 Behnkendorf
 Brandshagen
 Horst
 Kirchdorf
 Miltzow
 Reinberg
 Wilmshagen

References

External links
Wilmshagen fusion decree